Histidine-rich glycoprotein (HRG) is a glycoprotein that in humans is encoded by the HRG gene. The HRG protein is produced in the liver, and it could also be synthesized by monocytes, macrophages, and megakaryocytes. It possesses a multi-domain structure, which makes it capable of binding to numerous ligands and modulating various biological processes including immunity, vascularization and coagulation.

Structure

Gene
The HRG gene lies on location of 3q27 on the chromosome 3, spans approximately 11kb, and consist of 7 exons. Two common isoforms of the HRG gene have been found in humans. These isoforms exist due to a polymorphism occurring in exon 5.

Protein
HRG is a glycoprotein of 70-75kDa present at a relatively high concentration in the plasma of vertebrates. The primary structure of human HRG is predicted to be a 507 amino acid multidomain polypeptide consisting of two cystatin-like regions at the N-terminus, a histidine-rich region (HRR) flanked by proline-rich regions (PRR), and a C-terminal domain. HRG has an  unusually high concentration of histidine and proline residues, each constituting approximately 13% of total amino acids, concentrated within the HRR and PRR. The high concentration of both histidine and proline residues has resulted in HRG also being termed 'histidine–proline-rich glycoprotein' (HPRG). Human HRG is also composed of approximately 14% carbohydrate attached to six predicted N-linked glycosylation sites.

Function 

This histidine-rich glycoprotein contains two cystatin-like domains and is located in plasma and platelets. It is known that HRG binds heme, dyes, and divalent metal ions and it is thought to have multiple roles in the human blood, including roles in immunity, angiogenesis and coagulation.
It can inhibit rosette formation and interacts with heparin, thrombospondin, and plasminogen. Two of the protein's effects, the inhibition of fibrinolysis and the reduced inhibition of coagulation, indicate a potential prothrombotic effect. HRG is also reported to be involved in clearance of apoptotic phagocytes, immune complexes, cell adhesion, migration and angiogenesis, due to its ability to bind various ligands such as phospholipids, fibrinogen, plasminogen, heparin, heparansulfate, tropomysin, and heme, as well as the divalent metal ions zinc, copper, mercury, cadmium and nickel. Mutations in this gene lead to thrombophilia due to abnormal histidine-rich glycoprotein levels.

Clinical significance 

The implications of HRG in cancer have been described as "multi-faceted". For example, the protein appears to have both pro- and anti-angiogenic effects. In biomarker studies, the protein has been found to have potential prognostic and diagnostic value for cancer. Furthermore, the absence of the protein is associated with thrombophilia. HRG has also been shown to inhibit the M2-like phenotype of tumor-associated macrophages.

In addition, HRG has been discovered to play a role in infection. Some studies have found HRG has the antibacterial activity against Streptococcus pyogenes and a direct interaction between a S. pyogenes virulence factor (sHIP) and the human HRG has been identified.

Interactions 

This protein is known to interact with:
Thrombospondin
Haem
Zn2+
Heparin 
Plasminogen 
IgG

References

Further reading 

 
 
 
 
 
 
 
 
 
 
 
 
 
 
 
 
 
 
 

Glycoproteins
Genes on human chromosome 3